Rudolfiella floribunda is a species of orchid native to western South America.

References

External links 

floribunda
Orchids of South America